Trans in Trumpland is a 2021 American four episode docu-series directed by Tony Zosherafatain that chronicles the experiences of four transgender Americans during the Presidency of Donald Trump in North Carolina, Texas, Mississippi and Idaho and investigates transgender rights in the United States during the Trump era. It premiered on February 25, 2021, on Topic, a streaming service from First Look Media.

Production
The series was directed, hosted, and narrated by filmmaker Tony Zosherafatain. It was created by trans-run production company TransWave Films, and produced by Jamie DiNicola, with executive producers Trace Lysette, Miss Major Griffin-Gracy, and Chella Man. Associate producers include Miss Hazel Jade and Gabriel Resendez.

Development of the series began in 2016 the week that Trump won the election. In an interview with Interview Magazine, Zosherafatain stated: “in 2016, when Trump took office, I remember that first week just feeling really scared. He removed any mention of LGBTQ rights at all from the White House website, and I couldn’t really sleep. It was hard. Three days into his presidency, Trans in Trumpland just popped right in. It was like, ‘There you go. Run with this, kid.’ And then I had to think about what exactly this would mean. What kind of documentary would this be? I just had a feeling [Trump] was going to attack our community even worse than that first week.”

Zosherafatain “spent the next three years developing the concept and raising money through Kickstarter.” After a successful Kickstarter campaign in August 2019 raised $65,000, production began in September 2019 in North Carolina, Texas, Mississippi, and Idaho and filming completed in December 2019.

Episodes

Release
The series was acquired by Topic, the streaming service for First Look Media, which acquired North American streaming rights to the series. Trans in Trumpland was released on February 25, 2021, on Topic, and is also available on Amazon Prime Video and Apple TV.

Though the series premiered after Trump was no longer President of the United States, Zosherafatain believes that the issues raised in the series regarding transgender policies will remain relevant in the future.

Reception

Trans in Trumpland has received critical acclaim. Allsion Shoemaker and Saloni Gajjar of The A.V. Club wrote that the series is “a step beyond negative headlines, offering a glimpse into the lived experience of those directly affected by laws such as the discriminatory HB2 bill, which prohibits trans people from using bathrooms and lockers that align with their gender identity, or the trans military ban,” and “this docuseries is a heartfelt must-watch.” Writing for Vogue, Liam Hess summarized the effectiveness of the series stating, “the four stories come together to form a rich and moving tapestry, touching on how trans people across a range of intersectional identities have responded to the challenges of living under the Trump administration—as well as their hopes for and vision of the future.” Benedict Nguyen of  Vanity Fair called the series “a vital contribution to the trans media canon” but that the series “could have told more complex stories, covering an even wider breadth of experience or addressing the violence of Trump-era policies in more depth.”

LGBTQ+ media strongly praised the series. Johnny Yates of PinkNews described Trans in Trumpland as “a powerful new documentary that puts the spotlight on transgender lives in the Trump era...everyone needs to watch it.” Xoai Pham of Autostraddle stated, “rather than simply presenting the culture of violence, the series’ creator Tony Zosherafatain delivered a resounding celebration of the relationships that sustain trans lives” and that “we are in a new wave of visionary trans filmmaking, with documentaries like Disclosure feature films like Lingua Franca, and TV shows like Veneno. Remarkably, Trans in Trumpland is no exception.”

External links

References

2021 American television series debuts
2020s American documentary television series
English-language television shows
American LGBT-related web series
Transgender-related television shows